Celebrity Chef: East vs West is a television show produced by Fox Networks Group Asia. The show features Hong Kong singer and chef Nicholas Tse and Canadian chef David Rocco cooking local food in competition with each other. The show was filmed in China, Macau, the Philippines and Malaysia and aired on Fox Life on 25 March 2018.

References 

Fox Broadcasting Company original programming
Hong Kong
Cooking competitions